Hoko may refer to:

Places
Hoko, Kachin State, a village in Kachin State, Burma
Hōko Prefecture, administrative division of Taiwan under Japanese rule, corresponding to present-day Penghu County
Hōkō temple, name of several Japanese temples, see Hōkō-ji (disambiguation)
Hoko River, a river that flows in Clallam County, Washington

People
Paul Hodkinson aka Hoko (born 14 September 1965), boxer

Other uses
 Hoko (dance), Easter Island dance similar to Maori haka
 Hoko (doll), Japanese doll used as a talisman  
 Hōkō (mythology), dog-like tree spirit, equivalent to Chinese Penghou
 Hoko yari, old Japanese spear
 Hoko system, administrative system employed in Japanese-controlled Taiwan
 Hoko, an album by the late Zimbabwean musician Simon Chimbetu

See also
Houko Kuwashima (born December 12, 1975), Japanese voice actress and singer